Frederick Brock (born 1901) was an English professional association footballer, who played for Huddersfield Town.

References

1901 births
Year of death missing
Footballers from Huddersfield
English footballers
Association football defenders
English Football League players
Huddersfield Town A.F.C. players